The 1986 Winfield State League was the 5th season of the Queensland Rugby League's statewide competition. The competition was run similarly to the NSWRL's Amco Cup, featuring a short format prior the larger Brisbane Premiership season. The Wynnum Manly Seagulls defeated the Redcliffe Dolphins in the final at Lang Park in Brisbane, winning their third straight title.

Teams 
A total of 14 teams competed in the 1986 season, 8 of which were BRL Premiership clubs. The remaining six were regional teams from across the state.

Ladder

Finals 
The Seagulls would pull off a massive victory in the semi-finals against Ipswich, before defeating Redcliffe by a large margin in the Grand Final to win their third consecutive Winfield State League title.

References

Queensland Rugby League
Queensland Rugby League